Mount Bulusan, also known as Bulusan Volcano, is a stratovolcano on the island of Luzon in the Philippines.

It is one of the active volcanoes in the Philippines.

Physical features 
Bulusan is classified by volcanologists as a stratovolcano (or a composite cone) and covers the northeast rim of Irosin caldera that was formed about 40,000 years ago.

Around the mountain are four craters and four hot springs.

The volcano's hot springs are: 

 Mapaso
 Masacrot
 San Benon
 San Vicente

Adjacent volcanic edifices are: 

 Mount Batuan
 Mount Binitacan
 Mount Calaunan
 Mount Calungalan
 Mount Homahan
 Mount Jormajan
 Mount Juban
 Mount Tabon-Tabon

Eruptions 
Bulusan is generally known for its sudden, steam-driven or phreatic explosions. It has erupted 15 times since 1885 and is the fourth most active volcano in the Philippines after Mayon, Taal, and Kanlaon.

Evacuation procedures 
There are evacuation procedures in place for parts of the peninsula; the farms nearest the volcano are to be evacuated, and many village schools will be closed if a more destructive eruption is possible.

Recent activity

March–June 2006 
The Philippine Institute of Volcanology and Seismology (PHIVOLCS) declared alert level 1 on March 19, 2006, after it recorded increased seismic unrest. On June 8, 2006, volcanologists raised the alert level to 2 (moderate level of seismic unrest) after the volcano spewed ash.

On June 13, 2006, volcanologists said new craters were created by mild explosions. Aside from the new craters, two of the volcano's existing four craters appeared to have merged and cracks were observed on the western rim of the summit crater. Another eruption took place on April 8, 2007.

July–October 2007 

Following some signs of volcanic activity, on the morning of July 31, 2007, 9:37am (local time), there was a loud explosion described by locals as "like a bomb going off". The eruption lasted for 20 minutes.

November 2010 
On November 7, 2010, PHIVOLCS recorded increased seismic activity at Bulusan Volcano, 24 hours after the active volcano spewed a  ash column and grayish steam on November 5, 2010. State volcanologists noted that at least 10 volcanic earthquakes and four explosion-type events have been documented subsequent to the emission of ash and steam at 8a.m. on Saturday (November 5, 2010). PHIVOLCS also noted that steaming activity was characterized by strong emission of white steam column that reached a maximum height of 200 meters above the crater rim. It warned the public not to enter the four-kilometer permanent danger zone from the volcano. People near the valleys and streams were also advised to be "extra alert" against sediment-laden stream flows in the event of heavy rains. More ash ejection was reported on November 8–9, 2010, with ash fall in Juban and Irosin . A PHIVOLCS bulletin on November 9, 2010, stated that eight volcanic earthquakes were recorded from the volcano during the past 24 hours and weak to moderate emission of ash explosion was observed. PHIVOLCS also warned residents near valleys and streams against sediment-laden stream flows in the event of heavy and continuous rainfall.

February 2011 
PHIVOLCS has said such explosions are likely to continue for the coming weeks. Initially, hundreds of nearby residents evacuated on their own, but the government has stepped in to evacuate thousands more, and imposed a  travel ban around the crater. They also advised airplanes to avoid the immediate perimeter due to ash and debris in the air.

July 2014 
On July 13, 2014, during the 24-hour observation period, the seismic network detected thirteen volcanic earthquakes.

May–June 2015 
Mount Bulusan ejected a  ash plume on May 1, 2015, at around 9:46 pm, lasting for 3.5 minutes. The incident is classified as a "minor explosion event" by PHIVOLCS leading to the raising of alert level 1 (abnormal activity) for the surrounding area. A second ash explosion lasting for five minutes also occurred on the same day. PHIVOLCS determined the cause of the eruptions to be hydrothermal activity beneath the volcano. People were advised not to enter the  permanent danger zone. Further advisories were given to low-flying aircraft against the dangers of sudden phreatic eruptions, and to local residents near rivers and streams in case of lahar flows. There were also concerns that rains from Typhoon Noul could trigger lahars and mudslides near the mountain. However, after Noul recurved to the north, the threat did not materialize and the evacuees were permitted to return to their homes.

On June 16, Mount Bulusan generated two volcanic eruptions with the first one recorded at 11:02am which lasted for 10 minutes producing a one kilometer high grayish steam and ash plume and accompanied by rumbling sounds. The second one was recorded at 11:20am which lasted for a minute producing only a small ash plume. On June 18, the volcano once again erupted but was not observed visually due to thick clouds covering the summit. Prior to the eruption, rumbling sounds was heard between 5:00am to 7:00am by residents of the village of Monbon in Irosin town. The next day, June 19, Bulusan erupted yet again at around 2:55pm producing a 1.5-kilometer high ash plume.

June 2016 
On June 10, almost a year after its last eruption, Mount Bulusan erupted again at 11:35am. The eruption lasted for five minutes and generated an ash plume measuring 6,562 feet or some 2,000 meters. According to PHIVOLCS, the eruption was phreatic in nature and had a shallow source, with the ash drifting northwest to the direction of Juban town. While the PHIVOLCS did not raise the alert level 1 in the volcano, it advised residents not to enter the four-kilometer permanent danger zone and warned pilots not to fly near the volcano.

December 2016 
On December 29, Mount Bulusan had a phreatic eruption, shooting a plume of ash about two kilometers high. It happened 2:40pm local time and lasted for about 16-minutes. The eruption prompted PHIVOLCS to raise Alert level 1 for the surrounding areas and remind the public not to enter the 4-kilometer radius permanent danger zone.

May 2019 
On May 6, PHIVOLCS reported that two volcanic earthquakes were recorded during the past 24 hours. Wispy emission of white steam-laden plumes from the active vents was observed. alert level 1 (abnormal) status remains in effect.

July 2020 
PHIVOLCS raised the alert status of Bulusan Volcano from alert level 0 to alert level 1 after an increase in seismic activity was observed in the past days. PHIVOLCS reminded the public of the 4-km permanent danger zone (PDZ) around the Bulusan Volcano as sudden explosions might occur.

May 2021 
On May 11, PHIVOLCS raised the alert status of Bulusan Volcano from alert level 0 to alert level 1 due to increased seismic activity since May 8, 2021.

June 2022 
On June 5, 2022, PHIVOLCS reported that Mount Bulusan had a phreatic eruption at about one-kilometer, and the alert level status was raised to alert level 1. Ash fall was reported in Juban and Casiguran. The DOH advised the public to remain indoors. The local government of Juban ordered residents to evacuate from affected areas. Other agencies were advised to monitor the situation, while the NDRRMC reported at least 180 individuals from Juban have been evacuated. On June 12, a phreatic eruption took place at 3:37 am (local time) and lasted for about 18 minutes.

See also 
 Bulusan Volcano Natural Park

References

External links 

 NASA Earth Observatory satellite image of ash plume at Mount Bulusan
 
 Philippine Institute of Volcanology and Seismology (PHIVOLCS) Bulusan Volcano Page
 Photos of Bulusan volcano (Geographic.org)

Stratovolcanoes of the Philippines
Subduction volcanoes
Volcanoes of Luzon
Mountains of the Philippines
Active volcanoes of the Philippines
Landforms of Sorsogon